James Irwin Hartt (March 2, 1866 – February 17, 1935) was an Irish-born lumberman and political figure in Ontario. He represented Simcoe East in the Legislative Assembly of Ontario from 1911 to 1919 as a Conservative member.

The son of Isaac B. Hartt and Jane Irwin, he came to Canada in 1884. In 1897, Hartt married Flora Carter. He ran unsuccessfully for a seat in the Ontario assembly in 1908. Hartt served on the municipal council for Orillia. He died at Orillia in 1935.

References

External links

1866 births
1935 deaths
Progressive Conservative Party of Ontario MPPs
Canadian Methodists